Dali is a crater on Mercury. It has a diameter of 176 kilometers. Its name was adopted by the International Astronomical Union in 2008. Dali is named for the Spanish painter Salvador Dalí, who lived from 1904 to 1989.

See also
 List of craters on Mercury

References

Impact craters on Mercury
Salvador Dalí